Sarah Bilston is a British author and professor of English literature at Trinity College, Hartford. Bilston was born in Suffolk and studied at University College London and Somerville College, Oxford. She currently resides in Connecticut with her husband and three children. She has written three books: The Awkward Age in Women’s Popular Fiction, 1850-1900 and two novels, Bed Rest and Sleepless Nights.

Works 
Bed Rest tells the story of Quinn ‘Q’ Boothroyd, an English lawyer in New York who must go on bed rest for two months before the birth of her first child. It was published in May 2006 by HarperCollins (US) and March 2007 by Sphere (UK).

The sequel, Sleepless Nights, was published in December 2008.

The Awkward Age in Women’s Popular Fiction, 1850-1900: Girls and the Transition to Womanhood was published in 2004 by Oxford University Press.

References

External links
 http://sarahbilston.typepad.com/ Sarah Bilston's official website
 http://www.harpercollins.com/authors/30560/Sarah_Bilston/index.aspx Harper Collins' biography of Sarah Bilston
 http://www.tiborjones.com/author_sarah_bilston.html Tibor Jones' biography of Sarah Bilston

English women writers
Alumni of Somerville College, Oxford
Alumni of University College London
Trinity College (Connecticut) faculty
Living people
Year of birth missing (living people)